Paul Thys (born 2 May 1946) is a Belgian middle-distance runner. He competed in the 3000 metres steeplechase at the 1972 Summer Olympics and the 1976 Summer Olympics.

References

1946 births
Living people
Athletes (track and field) at the 1972 Summer Olympics
Athletes (track and field) at the 1976 Summer Olympics
Belgian male middle-distance runners
Belgian male steeplechase runners
Olympic athletes of Belgium
Place of birth missing (living people)